Emily Bonser (born 27 October 1995) is a retired Australian rules footballer who played for West Coast in the AFL Women's (AFLW).

AFLW career
Bonser joined West Coast for their inaugural season. At the end of the season, Bonser retired from football for personal reasons.

References

External links

 

Living people
1995 births
West Coast Eagles (AFLW) players
Australian rules footballers from Western Australia
Sportswomen from Western Australia